The Wugang dialect (Wu Kang in Wade–Giles) is an Old Xiang Chinese dialect spoken in Wugang, Hunan in China.

Classification
Wugang is an Old Xiang dialect, related to other Old Xiang dialects such as Shaoyang dialect.

Geographic distribution
The Wugang dialect is spoken in Wugang, Hunan.

Sub-dialects
The Wenping dialect is a sub-dialect of the Wugang dialect.

Features

Wugang words with the D tone are the only words in which devoicing can occur, with voiced stop and fricative initials.

The Wugang dialect is one of the dialects that uses "佢" or "其" as the pronoun for the third person.

See also
 Xiang Chinese
 List of Chinese dialects

References

Xiang Chinese
Dialects by location